East Rigton is a hamlet in West Yorkshire, England, immediately to the east of Bardsey.

Etymology
The name of East Rigton is first attested in the Domesday Book, as Riston, Ritone, and Ritun. The name comes from the Old Norse word hryggr ('ridge'), which had come into more general use in Old English, and the straightforwardly Old English word tūn ('farmstead, estate'). The additional element east is first attested in 1530, in the form Est Ryghton.

See also
Listed buildings in Bardsey cum Rigton

References

Hamlets in West Yorkshire